The Geely CD is a 2-door coupé from Chinese manufacturer Geely Automobile.

Overview

The Chinese name for the Geely CD is the "Geely Zhongguolong" (中国龙), meaning "Chinese Dragon", with the "CD" name based on it. The CD was shown at the Frankfurt Motor Show in 2005 along with four other Geely models. The CD is designed with help from Daewoo. Its 1.5 L engine is based on one from Toyota. It produces 94 hp (70 kW) at 6000 rpm.

References

External links

CD
Coupés
Cars introduced in 2009
Sports cars
Cars of China